Desis is a genus of intertidal spiders that was first described by Charles Athanase Walckenaer in 1837. It is found in Australasia, the Pacific, Japan, eastern and southern Africa, and India. They are truly marine spiders, living in the intertidal zone and only emerging at night on the ebb tide to hunt for invertebrates and small fish. In the day and during high tides, they hide in an air chamber sealed with silk.

Species
 it contains fourteen species:
Desis bobmarleyi Baehr, Raven & Harms, 2017 – Australia (Queensland)
Desis crosslandi Pocock, 1903 – Tanzania (Zanzibar), Madagascar, Comoros, Mayotte
Desis formidabilis (O. Pickard-Cambridge, 1891) – Namibia, South Africa
Desis galapagoensis Hirst, 1925 – Ecuador (Galapagos Is.)
Desis gardineri Pocock, 1904 – India (Laccadive Is.)
Desis inermis Gravely, 1927 – India
Desis japonica Yaginuma, 1956 – Japan
Desis kenyonae Pocock, 1902 – Australia (Victoria, Tasmania)
Desis marina (Hector, 1877) – New Caledonia, New Zealand (mainland, Chatham Is.)
Desis martensi L. Koch, 1872 – Malaysia
Desis maxillosa (Fabricius, 1793) (type) – New Guinea, New Caledonia
Desis risbeci Berland, 1931 – New Caledonia
Desis tangana Roewer, 1955 – East Africa
Desis vorax L. Koch, 1872 – Samoa

References

Araneomorphae genera
Desidae
Spiders of Africa
Spiders of Asia
Spiders of Australia
Taxa named by Charles Athanase Walckenaer